Troschelia berniciensis is a species of sea snail, a marine gastropod mollusk in the family Buccinidae, the true whelks.

Description
The length of the shell attains 100.2 mm.

(Described as Buccinofusus berniciensis) The whorls are encircled with alternately larger and smaller revolving ridges, decussated by fine growth-lines. The margin of the outer lip is slightly everted. The shell is thin, white and covered with a very thin, light olive epidermis.

The shape of the shell is variable in height and in height-to-breadth ratios, depending on the depth of occurrence and the latitude.

Distribution
This species occurs in the northeastern Atlantic Ocean in deep water between 400 and 1600 m from the Morocco coast to Norway.

References

 Sysoev A.V. (2014). Deep-sea fauna of European seas: An annotated species check-list of benthic invertebrates living deeper than 2000 m in the seas bordering Europe. Gastropoda. Invertebrate Zoology. Vol.11. No.1: 134–155
 de Kluijver, M. J.; Ingalsuo, S. S.; de Bruyne, R. H. (2000). Macrobenthos of the North Sea [CD-ROM]: 1. Keys to Mollusca and Brachiopoda. World Biodiversity Database CD-ROM Series. Expert Center for Taxonomic Identification (ETI): Amsterdam, The Netherlands. . 1 cd-rom

External links

  Serge GOFAS, Ángel A. LUQUE, Joan Daniel OLIVER,José TEMPLADO & Alberto SERRA (2021) - The Mollusca of Galicia Bank (NE Atlantic Ocean); European Journal of Taxonomy 785: 1–114
 King, W. (1846). An account of some shells and other invertebrate from found on the coast of Northumberland and of Durham. Annals and Magazine of Natural History. 18: 233-251
 Watson, R. B. (1886). Report on the Scaphopoda and Gasteropoda collected by H.M.S. Challenger during the years 1873-76. Report on the Scientific Results of the Voyage of H.M.S. Challenger during the years 1873–76. Zoology 15 (part 42): 1-756, pls 1-50.
 Locard, A. (1897-1898). Expéditions scientifiques du Travailleur et du Talisman pendant les années 1880, 1881, 1882 et 1883. Mollusques testacés. Paris, Masson. vol. 1 
 Jeffreys, J. G. (1862-1869). British conchology. Vol. 1: pp. cxiv + 341
 Jeffreys, J. G. (1877). New and peculiar Mollusca of the Eulimidae and other families of Gastropoda, as well as of the Pteropoda, procured in the Valorous expedition. Annals and Magazine of Natural History. (4)19: 317-339.
  Bouchet, P. & Warén, A. (1985). Revision of the Northeast Atlantic bathyal and abyssal Neogastropoda excluding Turridae (Mollusca, Gastropoda). Bollettino Malacologico. supplement 1: 121-296

Buccinidae
Gastropods described in 1846